Only Built 4 Cuban Linx... (commonly referred to as The Purple Tape) is the debut studio album by American rapper and Wu-Tang Clan member Raekwon, released on August 1, 1995, by Loud Records and RCA Records. The album was loosely composed to play like a film with Raekwon as the "star", fellow Wu-Tang member Ghostface Killah as the "guest-star", and producer RZA as the "director", It features appearances from every member of the Wu-Tang Clan. The album also features debut appearances from affiliates Cappadonna and Blue Raspberry, and an acclaimed guest appearance from rapper Nas, which marked the first collaboration with a non-affiliated artist on a Wu-Tang related album.

Upon its release, Only Built 4 Cuban Linx... debuted at number four on the Billboard 200 chart, and number two on the Top R&B/Hip-Hop Albums chart, while selling 130,000 copies in its opening week. The album was certified gold by the Recording Industry Association of America (RIAA) on October 2, 1995, and later platinum on February 24, 2020. According to Nielsen Soundscan, it has sold 1.1 million copies in the United States alone as of 2009. Although it failed to acquire the same initial sales success as previous Wu-Tang solo albums, Cuban Linx achieved greater critical praise, with many complimenting its cinematic lyricism and production.

Only Built 4 Cuban Linx... has received acclaim from music critics and writers over the years, with many lauding it as one of the greatest hip hop albums of all time. With its emphasis on American Mafia insinuations and organized crime, the album is widely regarded as a pioneer of the mafioso rap subgenre. It is considered to have been highly influential on hip hop music over the next decade, being heavily referenced and influential on acclaimed albums such as Jay-Z's Reasonable Doubt (1996) and The Notorious B.I.G.'s Life After Death (1997). Along with GZA's Liquid Swords, Cuban Linx is the most acclaimed solo Wu-Tang work. Rolling Stone magazine placed it at number 480 on their The 500 Greatest Albums of All Time list in 2012, and at number 219 in the 2020 reboot of the list.

Background 
Raekwon released Only Built 4 Cuban Linx... as his first solo album, and the third seen from the Wu after the release of their debut album Enter the Wu-Tang (36 Chambers), with Method Man's Tical and Ol' Dirty Bastard's Return to the 36 Chambers: The Dirty Version released prior. The song "Can It Be All So Simple", from 36 Chambers, marked the first recorded exhibition of Raekwon and Ghostface Killah as a duo, as the two would further establish this alliance on Only Built 4 Cuban Linx.... Much of the content on the album deals with real life topics and situations that both Raekwon and Ghostface Killah commonly encountered and experienced while growing up in Staten Island, New York. In an interview with Wax Poetics, Raekwon explained "I grew up in the street, so I talked about the shit I knew and saw. We did the hustlin' thing, we did the crime thing; we did all the things that made us feel like mobsters or Mafiosos in some way." In a different article, Ghostface Killah recollected "Back then I was punchin' a lot of rap niggas in their face, and niggas was getting beat up in the clubs. We were banned from everything. They wouldn't even let me in the Tunnel. Niggas was scared to death when I was out there wilding. I was fucking niggas up, robbing niggas, fucking a lot of bitches, just doing dumb shit."

In regard to his and Ghostface's partnership, Raekwon later commented "Ghost and me, especially at the time, had this identical-twin effect on each other. We would joke about the same things and laugh at the same shit. We were into the same clothes and shit. We were like the EPMD of the crew." Producer RZA also commented on the duo's congruency:

Only Built 4 Cuban Linx... features a wide array of Wu-Tang members, as well as Wu-Tang affiliates Cappadonna, and Blue Raspberry. It also features a guest appearance from rapper Nas, making this the first collaboration with a non-affiliated artist on a Wu-Tang related album. Regarding this event, Nas later recalled "Rae would come out to Queensbridge, I would go to Staten Island. We'd just ride and hang out all night. We didn't call each other to work. We called each other to hang out. Somehow we wound up in the studio. RZA had a couple of beats. He played them for me. I got on both of them. The other one never came out. I was honored to be asked to be on the album. Raekwon was ahead of his time. I knew Rae was a classic artist and the album was going to be a music classic."

Title significance 
The album's title serves as "a warning of its musical potency to those not prepared for the uncut raw contained within." Although the original intended title was "Only Built 4 Cuban Linx Niggaz", this idea was eventually dismissed in favor of a more market-friendly one. Ghostface Killah later specified "We already had the title. The chain we used to rock back in the days was Cuban links. So Rae came up with the theory, like a Cuban link is one of the roughest chains to break. Only Built 4 Cuban Linx... Real niggas, strong niggas."

The album is also commonly referred to as "The Purple Tape" because the original cassette's plastic was entirely purple; Raekwon marked the tape distinctively as a reference to drug dealers' method of tagging their product, to distinguish it from that of others. "I wanted to portray an image that if I was selling crack or dimes in the street, you would recognize these dimes from other niggas' dimes."

Recording and production 

Recording sessions began in late 1994, and proceeded midway through 1995 in RZA's basement studio in Staten Island, the same studio that many of the group's earlier albums were recorded in. In regard to Raekwon and Ghostface Killah's original recording intentions, RZA recounted "They had wanted to go to Barbados. But when they got to Barbados, the racism was so crazy. It was on some slave mentality. The Blacks was being treated like shit. They stopped back, and everything was recorded in my basement. No engineer, no assistant engineer. I did everything on that shit. The only two albums I did with nobody fucking with me was Linx and Liquid Swords. I was on a mission. To make all those early albums took three and a half years of my life. I didn't come outside, didn't have too many girl relations, didn't even enjoy the shit. I just stayed in the basement. Hours and hours and days and days. Turkey burgers and blunts. I didn't know if it was working. But nobody could hear or say nothing, no comments, no touching the board when I leave. Everything was just how I wanted it." Regarding the recording atmosphere, Raekwon stated "The way RZA had it poppin' back then, we would come into his spot. It was like dudes would come in on their own time and create stuff. I remember I just came in, and the beats was just pumpin'."

Seeking to musically express Raekwon's blend of Five Percenter creed and inner-city experience, producer RZA worked intensively on a polished sound, slower and more layered than that of Wu-Tang's previous efforts, using strings, piano loops and vocal samples from Kung Fu movies, and Mafia films. Due to Raekwon's storytelling, mobster-minded approach, the producer set up Only Built 4 Cuban Linx... to play like scenes in a crime movie. RZA has cited soul musician Isaac Hayes as an influence on his orchestral approach to several of the album's tracks. He also later revealed that several of the album's beats, such as "Incarcerated Scarfaces", were originally intended for Wu-Tang member GZA's Liquid Swords album, but because of Raekwon's timely writing approach, were used last minute for Cuban Linx. In regard to this, Raekwon clarified "RZA's house was more or less like a candy store. You come in and have all kinds of shit to choose from. I would take stuff that I felt would suit my album correctly; others would take their own beats too. The beats were like a grab bag. If I came in and heard a beat that someone already claimed, then I just had to fall back. We almost never fought over beats or nothing. I'd tell RZA if I liked a certain beat, and he'd see if it would fit me or not."

Throughout the album, producer RZA sampled dialogue from various scenes in the John Woo film The Killer. RZA later recollected "I met John Woo that same year. He sent me a letter. He was honored that we did it. I felt confident we could settle anything that came up. You can usually settle that shit. It's part of the budget, man. But John Woo didn't want nothing, never no money for that. We actually became friends. He took me and Ghost to lunch and dinner many times. He gave me a lot of mentoring in film."

Gambinos 
The song "Wu-Gambinos" was one of the first songs recorded for the album, and marked the beginning of the Gambino aliases used for the members who appeared on the album, and would eventually become highly influential on hip hop. Raekwon later explained "The Wu-Gambinos aliases come from how I used to like that movie Once Upon a Time in America, with Robert De Niro and James Woods. I liked how these young little niggas grew up, from the ground up, not having nothing to start. And the names came. You know, "Tony Starks" came from Iron Man. "Lou Diamond" came from Louis Roederer who made Cristal, and from me being infatuated with the diamond world. Back then I was wearing a lot of ice, was calling shit ice. But then I started giving some of my niggas in the crew names. Being that it's my album, I wanted niggas to know, you gotta have a certain a.k.a. when you're on this track. This is a Gambino track. Wu-Gambinos. I would call Masta Killa "Noodles," call GZA "Maximillian." Inside the movie (Once Upon a Time in America), Noodles and Max was partners. I felt like GZA was like Maximillian because he was like the brains of the crew. He would say something real intellectual and smart. I called Deck "Rollie Fingers" cause of the way he roll blunts. So names just started fitting niggas."

Music and lyrics 

Only Built 4 Cuban Linx... is often commemorated for its introduction to a distinctive slang individual to Raekwon and Ghostface; heavy use of the Supreme Alphabet and Supreme Mathematics, as often used by the Wu-Tang Clan, blended with terms picked up on the inner-city streets of New York, as well as several songs based around detailed, loosely-connected stories. In an article for XXL, RZA later illustrated "The theme of the album is two guys that had enough of the negative life and was ready to move on, but had one more sting to pull off. They're tired of doing what they doing, but they're trying to make this last quarter million. That's a lot of money in the streets. We gonna retire and see our grandbabies and get our lives together."

In keeping with this loose storyline, the album opens with the introduction track "Striving for Perfection", in which Raekwon and "co-star" Ghostface converse about visions and goals. On the proceeding track "Knuckleheadz", Raekwon and Ghostface divide money in the song's intro, and then engage in a heist, with U-God's character being killed off at the end of his verse. The reason for this elimination is because U-God was sentenced to serve several months in prison, which prevented subsequent participation on Cuban Linx. U-God, however, recruited his lyric mentor and childhood friend Cappadonna to take his place later in the album.

Only Built 4 Cuban Linx... features dialogue-driven interludes in the beginning of several tracks with Raekwon and Ghostface Killah conversing about money, life, crime, and hip hop, among other things. The introduction to "Glaciers of Ice", for instance, involves Ghostface addressing his plans and methods of dyeing Wallabee-styled Clarks. In a 2005 interview, Ghostface Killah explained "We was in the car one day, driving around with the DAT machine with a microphone and we just started talking shit about how we're gonna do it this summer with the Clarks. The dyeing was something I was doing already. I'm an inventor. Niggas can't fuck with me when it comes to style. Only nigga that is right there with me is probably Slick Rick. Other than that, I'm boss."

The album ends with the song "North Star", which serves as a "closing credits" type of song. In regard to this track and Popa Wu's inclusion, RZA later remarked "The idea is Rae did everything he had to do. Everything is over now. The job is over. Mission is over, it's a perfect closing to the album. Popa Wu was a very smart mentor in the younger days to me and ODB. Everybody had dibs and dabs of knowledge of self, I brought him in to be a mentor to these men like, 'I love them and you the only person I know that have the intelligence to keep them in sync with knowledge.' It's very poisonous unless they got proper guidance. He was the smartest man I'd ever met at a certain time in my life." Raekwon further commented "'North Star' was a track I really, really wanted on my album. It was a track that I felt a vibe of it was motion picture-like."

Singles 

Though several songs, such as "Glaciers of Ice" and "Incarcerated Scarfaces", received radio play and music video treatment, only four official singles were released for Only Built 4 Cuban Linx.... The first of which was "Heaven & Hell", released October 24, 1994. Aside from being the album's first single, it was also the first song recorded for the album, serving as an installment to the soundtrack for the movie Fresh. The song features the second recorded appearance of Wu-Tang affiliate Blue Raspberry, who provides backing vocals. In 1994, "Heaven & Hell" reached number 32 on the Hot Rap Singles chart, and number 34 on the Hot Dance Music/Maxi-Singles Sales chart. One year later, it re-entered the Hot Rap Singles chart, peaking at number 21.

With "Glaciers of Ice" as its B-Side, the album's second single "Criminology" was released June 26, 1995, almost one year after "Heaven and Hell." It had notable chart success, as it peaked at number 43 on the Billboard Hot 100, and number 5 on the Hot Rap Singles chart. Producer RZA later illustrated "That was me trying to produce like a DJ, produce a breakbeat. Ghost actually asked me to make one of those beats. You listen to old DJ tapes. That's how I made that song, and he wanted this shit to sound like a breakbeat. He had a rhyme that he knew was going to change the game - that was the verse that got him recognized. Cypress Hill's DJ Muggs called up and was like "Yo, he killed that shit. He ripped that shit."

Serving as the album's most radio-friendly track, "Ice Cream" was released September 25, 1995, with "Incarcerated Scarfaces" as its B-side. This proved to be the most successful single off the album, as it reached the 37th spot on the Billboard Hot 100, and the fifth spot on the Hot Rap Singles chart. The song uses different flavor variants of ice cream as a metaphor for different races of women. Raekwon later commented "we wanted to reach out and let the women know that we respected them as queens. And queens, much like ice cream, come in all different flavors." The song marks the second appearance of Cappadonna on the album, and serves as his break-through performance, as it would give him commercial exposure. In regard to his guest spot, Cappadonna later recalled "I had heard Rae's and Ghost's verses on there. And I had made a joke about me getting on the track, and RZA took it seriously and was like "Yo, go ahead. Lace that."

"Rainy Dayz" was the fourth and final single for the album, released
as a Promotional recording on vinyl in early 1996. In regard to the song's lyrics, Raekwon summarized "this is for the struggling girl who can't understand her man and he a thorough nigga. We wanted to put a girl from the movie The Killer in the skit, at the start of the song, when she said 'I sing for him and he isn't here.' He ain't here, cause he makin' money! He trying to put some food on the table." Producer RZA has stated that "Rainy Dayz" is one of his all-time favorite songs on the album.

Critical reception 

Only Built 4 Cuban Linx… was well received by contemporary critics. The Source magazine's Nicholas Poluhoff said "Raekwon has always brought his own special flavor to the Wu cipher: he sprays out lyrics like gunfire, forming vivid tales. What truly sets Cuban Linx apart is the sheer abundance of well-written, complex lyrics." Poluhoff also praised RZA's production, viewing it as his best yet: "The tracks are suited to the distinct flow of the Chef, who weaves in and out between beats." Cheo H. Coker from Spin magazine found Raekwon to be as vivid a lyricist as Kool G Rap, "so vivid you smell the gunpowder and wipe the blood on your shirt", while crediting RZA for "taking the art form of production to new heights". Los Angeles Times said the songs with other Wu-Tang Clan members are as good as anything on Enter the 36 Chambers and wrote of the music: "RZA's production sensibilities, sometimes minimal, other times symphonic, pull the listener in despite the chaos. In a genre characterized by singles, Cuban Linx is a full-blown album where the big picture is just as moving as the compositional stylistic elements." In Vibe magazine, Dream Hampton was impressed by Raekwon and Ghostface Killah's use of cultural appropriation (as a type of "sweet vindication") in their lyrics and said they "bring the best in each other."

Only Built 4 Cuban Linx... has since been ranked by critics and publications as one of the greatest hip hop albums of all time. The Rolling Stone Album Guide (2004) called it essential listening for anyone interested in the Wu-Tang Clan, while Steve Huey from AllMusic said Raekwon is "arguably the Wu's best storyteller", crediting him for "translating epic themes and narratives of a mafia movie into a startlingly accomplished hip-hop album". Huey argued the record was possibly the "best Wu-Tang solo album", along with GZA's Liquid Swords, and wrote that like that album, "Only Built 4 Cuban Linx takes a few listens to reveal the full scope of its lyrical complexities, but it's immensely rewarding in the end."

In 2012, Rolling Stone magazine ranked the album number 480 on its list of The 500 Greatest Albums of All Time, saying that "the best Wu-Tang solo joint is a study in understated cool and densely woven verses" and that "Raekwon crafts breathtaking drug-rap narratives; it's a rap album that rivals the mob movies hip-hop celebrates. In the 2020 reboot of the list, the album's rank shot up to number 219.

Legacy and influence

Gambinos 
OB4CL popularized street-related, Mafioso rap on the east coast. While this style was originated by Kool G Rap in the late 1980s, it didn't completely permeate the hip hop world until the release of OB4CL in 1995. References to Cuban Linx could be heard heavily in following years with several notable changes in hip hop culture. For instance, the album refers to "Wu-Gambinos" in various occurrences; the term being a name for the 'alter-egos' of the rappers involved in Cuban Linx, and used on various later projects. These alter-egos inspired an already dissociative hip-hop world to adopt new names and personae, from Nas' Escobar moniker to Notorious B.I.G.'s Frank White counterpart, which he would go on to further utilize upon the release of OB4CL. A known fan of the Wu, Tupac Shakur began to refer to himself as Makaveli and gave his Outlawz crew new names, albeit with a militaristic, dictatorial theme. In regard to Raekwon's innovation of the gambinos, Method Man later affirmed "Raekwon started that. Rae always had that mobster mentality, always liked to watch gangster movies and read mob books and stuff like that, you know? So he pretty much knew the names of the cats and what they was about. He polished his whole style like that." Ghostface Killah also touched base on the gambino influence stating "We done took that to the highest peak. We bonded as a tight family, so niggas is starting to try and do that right now. Everybody thinking they have a strong family. We opened up the door for a lot of niggas. The shit was just crazy on how it came together."

Cristal 
Another exemplification of Cuban Linxs influence is in the spike in popularity of Cristal, an expensive champagne, which was mentioned on the album and touted by Rae and Ghost. It has now become a staple in hip hop, with name-drops that continue to this day. The brand even made its way into popular culture when director Quentin Tarantino, a known affiliate of RZA and the Wu-Tang Clan, goes on a rant about the champagne's quality in his segment of Four Rooms, a film released in the months after Raekwon's album.

In regard to this trend, Raekwon later clarified "We was the first to be talking that Cristal shit. I know that for a fact. Back then we would go do dinners and sit with Loud Records president Steve Rifkind and them up at the label. And our mission would be like, when we sit at the table, we want the best fuckin' wine they got in the building. We might have asked for some Mo or something and they didn't have it. So we was like "What the fuck is the next best thing, Steve?" And Steve's like 'Give 'em the next best thing.' They came out with Cristal. Me and Ghost liked the bottle, and the name on the bottle was Louie Roederer. I was like, I'm Lou Diamond, Louie Roederer. Me and Ghost is loving how the bottle looked. It cost more than the muthafuckin' other, so we was like, Cristal, nigga! That's our new shit!"

 Hip hop albums 

Ironically enough, despite Raekwon and Ghost's warning on "Shark Niggas (Biters)" to "be original", OB4CL's influence spawned a countless number of albums with many of the adopted principles that it set in place. The year following its release, in 1996, Jay-Z released his debut album Reasonable Doubt, which describes a lavish, Cristal-drinking mobster persona and deals with the subjects of street crime and getting out of drug-dealing and into the rap game, much like the topics covered on OB4CL. Jay-Z would later reference Cuban Linx in his 2009 song "A Star Is Born" by stating "Wu-Tang gangbanged it, Meth ate / Rae took on a date with the Purple Tape / passed it on to Ason, then Ghostface / they had a hell of a run, stand and ovate." Raekwon later commented in an interview "Jay was a student of our shit and what we accomplished in those days. He'll tell you that himself."

The same year, highly acclaimed rapper Nas released It Was Written, revising his image to incorporate the Mafia posturing of Raekwon; adopting the Mafioso moniker "Nas Escobar" bestowed upon him by his guest appearance on Cuban Linx. 1996 also saw the releases of Ghostface Killah's debut album Ironman, which loosely covers some of the topics on Cuban Linx, and also Mobb Deep's second major-label album, Hell on Earth, which showcased the duo's interpretation of the Cuban Linx demeanor, and featured contributions from Raekwon, Method Man, and Nas. In 1997, The Notorious B.I.G. revamped his image into that of a gun-toting, big-money making, mob-commanding kingpin, most notably on the songs "Niggas Bleed", "What's Beef", "My Downfall", and "I Love the Dough" featuring Jay-Z (previously mentioned); Nas, then with The Firm, put out a similarly minded album that year in The Firm: The Album.

The influence of Only Built 4 Cuban Linx... continued through into the 2000s with other albums, such as Rick Ross' Deeper Than Rap and Jay-Z's American Gangster, continuing to find success following the album's overall structure and premise. Though Cuban Linx would prove to be highly influential, Raekwon later revealed that he had no intentions for this impact, stating "Really, I was just trying to make something worth purchasing and worth respecting."

 Sequel 
After two solo projects that were both critically and commercially unsuccessful, Raekwon announced a sequel to Only Built 4 Cuban Linx... in late 2005. The sequel was highly anticipated for nearly four years since its original announcement and fourteen years after the release of the original, appearing in XXLs top 10 list of most anticipated albums in 2007. Only Built 4 Cuban Linx... Pt. II was released in 2009 to critical acclaim.

 Track listing 
Track listing and credits adapted from Tidal. All tracks produced by RZA, and written by Corey Woods and Robert Diggs; except where noted.Notes"Striving For Perfection" and "Shark Niggas (Biters)" contain additional vocals from Ghostface Killah.
"Glaciers of Ice" contains additional vocals from Blue Raspberry and 60 Second Assassin.
"Heaven and Hell" contains additional vocals from Blue Raspberry.
"North Star (Jewels) contains additional vocals from Popa Wu and Ol' Dirty Bastard.Sample credits'''
 "Criminology" contains samples from "I Keep Asking You Questions" by Black Ivory.
 "Can It Be All So Simple (Remix)" contains a sample from "The Way We Were" by Gladys Knight & the Pips.
 "Verbal Intercourse" contains a sample from "If You Think It (You May As Well Do It)" by The Emotions.
 "Heaven & Hell" contains a sample from "Could I Be Falling in Love" by Syl Johnson.
 "North Star (Jewels)" contains a sample from "Mellow Mood Part One" by Barry White.

 Personnel 

Raekwon as Lex Diamond – performer
Ghostface Killah as Tony Starks – performer, executive producer
RZA as Bobby Steels – performer, arranger, producer, engineer, mixing, executive producer
Cappadonna as Cappachino – performer
Masta Killa as Noodles – performer
Method Man as Johnny Blaze – performer
U-God as Golden Arms – performer
GZA as Maximillion – performer
Inspectah Deck as Rollie Fingers – performer
Nas as Nas Escobar – performer
Blue Raspberry – vocals
Ol' Dirty Bastard – vocals

Popa Wu – vocals
60 Second Assassin – vocals
4th Disciple – mixing
Islord – arranger, assistant engineer
Mitchell Diggs – executive producer
Oli Grant – executive producer
Tom Coyne – mastering
Schott Free – A&R
Matt Life – A&R
Daniel Hastings – photography
Miguel Rivera – design
Christian Cortes – design

Charts

Weekly charts

Year-end charts

Certifications

 Accolades 

 Notes 

 See also 
 Album era

 References 

 External links 
 Only Built 4 Cuban Linx…'' at Discogs
Only Built 4 Cuban Linx... at MusicBrainz

1995 debut albums
Raekwon albums
Loud Records albums
RCA Records albums
Albums produced by RZA
Mafioso rap albums
Concept albums
Wu-Tang Clan